North Greene High School is a high school in Greene County located at 4675 Old Baileyton Road in Baileyton, Tennessee. It is operated by  Greene County Schools.  It is a consolidation of West Pines, Ottway, and Baileyton high schools.

Feeder schools
 Baileyton Elementary (grades PreK–5)
 North Greene Middle (formerly known as Ottway Elementary, grades 6–8)

Faculty
Staff:
Principal
Amanda Weems

Athletics
Students may participate in a variety of athletic programs:
Band
Baseball
Basketball - Boys and Girls
Cheerleading
Football
Golf - Boys and Girls
Softball
Tennis - Boys and Girls
Volleyball

Clubs
Students may participate in a wide variety of clubs:
FFA(Future Farmers of America)
FCA(Fellowship of Christian Athletes)
International Club
Strategy Club
Science Club
Book Club
BETA Club
TSA(Technology Student Association)

References

 http://greenetn.nghs.schooldesk.net/NGHSInfo/FacultyStaff/tabid/11592/Default.aspx
 http://greenetn.nghs.schooldesk.net/Athletics/Athletics/tabid/16141/Default.aspx

External links
 Official website.
 School district website

Greeneville, Tennessee
Public high schools in Tennessee
Schools in Greene County, Tennessee
1963 establishments in Tennessee
Educational institutions established in 1963